The Six Nations of the Grand River Elected Council is the governing body of Six Nations of the Grand River established under the Indian Act in 1924. The Elected Council consists of one Grand Chief and nine Councillors elected to four year terms, with the current council elected in November 2019.

Over its history, elections for the Elected Council have had extremely low turnout-- for instance, the 2013 election had a turnout of 5.15%-- due in part to some Six Nations citizens believing the council to have usurped the power of the traditional government of the Haudenosaunee Confederacy, organized today as the Haudenosaunee Confederacy Chiefs Council.

Current Council 
The current Elected Council was sworn in on November 12, 2019.

Grand Chief: Mark Hill

Councillors: Sherri Lyn Hill-Pierce, Melba I. Thomas, Audrey Powless-Bomberry, Michelle J. Bomberry, Hazel Johnson, Helen Miller, Nathan M. Wright, Kerry Bomberry, Gregory Frazer

Electoral Districts 

Beginning with the 4th Elected Council in 1927, until the implementation of the 2019 election code, Six Nations was divided into six electoral districts, with two Councillors (including the Chief) elected per district.

List of Elected Councils

Band Councils elected under the Indian Act (1924-1995) 
The first election under Section 74 of the Indian Act within the Six Nations Band of Indians (as it was known at the time) was held on October 21st, 1924, with the first meeting of the elected council taking place the following day at the Council House in Ohsweken. A pamphlet meant to provide information on the election announced that the reserve would "be divided into six Electoral Districts, numbered from one to six." These electoral districts remained in place until the 2019 election code reform. At the time of the first election, the Secretary of the Haudenosaunee Confederacy Council, Chief Dave Hill, Sr., reported that only 26 people voted in the election of this council, most or all of them voting twice.

The Elected Council was known simply as the "Six Nations council" until the official name of the reserve and its governing body was changed to "the Six Nations of the Grand River" under Bill Montour sometime between 1985 and 1991. Throughout the 20th century, the chief of the elected council was most commonly referred to as the "Chief Councillor", though this changed with the 49th Elected Council in 1994.

The term of each council was (more or less) one year until the 28th Elected Council in 1952, from which point the term was (more or less) two years.

Band Councils elected under the Six Nations Election Code, 1995 (1995 - 2019) 
In August 1995, the 49th Elected Council voted to change the Six Nations electoral system. Elections for Council would no longer be subject to the Indian Act, and would be governed by a custom electoral system. Despite lacking widespread support, the change to the electoral system was approved by the federal government two days before the advance poll for the upcoming election in October 1995. Changes from the Indian Act system implemented under the 1995 election code included:
 Extending the term of office to 3 years;
 Giving off-reserve band members the right to vote;
 Requiring the Chief to reside in the community;
 Deeming a chief or councillor, if removed from office, would be unable to be eligible to run for office for three years;
 Requiring prospective candidates submit to a police check, and barring any candidate with a criminal conviction in the U.S. or Canada in the 3 years prior to election day from running;
 Providing for an advance poll and an appeals process;
 Requiring candidates to provide a biographical description of themselves when nominated;
 Instituting an impeachment process by which a chief or councillor could be removed from office by those members that participated in their election; and
 Making the elections subject to the Canadian Charter of Rights and Freedoms
These councils were sometimes referred to as "custom" councils.

Legal challenge 
The implementation of a new election code was criticized, as community members felt Council had not engaged in the appropriate consultation required for such an action. In early 1996, author Brian Maracle and his sister Marilyn Maracle (who had been a candidate for chief in the '95 election but withdrew her nomination) disputed the legality of the custom electoral system, asserting that, in addition to inadequate community consultation, "the "custom" of Six Nations in choosing its leadership was through the age-old Hodenosaunee [sic] Confederacy." The two sued the band council and Minister of Indian Affairs in federal court with a goal of having the election nullified. In April 1998, the Maracles proposed an out-of-court settlement that was accepted by the elected council. The settlement required the band council to revert to the previous election system and to state publicly that they "wouldn't try to install another elections code without first getting the community's approval."

The 50th Elected Council sent two resolutions to INAC, asking to be placed back under Indian Act election guidelines, agreeing with the Maracles that there had been no widespread support for the custom election code. However, councillor Dave Hill and chief Wellington Staats told a local newspaper that INAC officials seemed uninterested in acting on the band council resolutions, and the 1998 election was held under the custom electoral system. In response to the council proceeding with the election under the custom system, the Maracles threatened to request an injunction against the election in the month before it was scheduled to take place.

Band Councillors elected under the Six Nations of the Grand River 2019 Election Code (2019 - present) 
The election code was modified again in 2019. Changes to the 1995 election code included:
 Amalgamating the six separate electoral districts within SNGR to one large voting district;
 Reducing the number of Councillors from 12 to 9;
 Increasing the term of office from 3 years to 4 years;
 Establishing a two-term limit for Councillors;
 Establishing a minimum education requirement (high school diploma or GED) for Councillor candidates; and
 Establishing an independent Integrity Commission

First Nations governments in Ontario
Six Nations of the Grand River